Paper Money is the second studio album by the American hard rock band Montrose, released on October 11, 1974, by Warner Bros. Records. It was produced by Ted Templeman and is the band's final recording with original vocalist Sammy Hagar. It marks the arrival of new bass player Alan Fitzgerald, replacing original bassist Bill Church.

History
Paper Money was the band's highest-charting release, reaching No. 65 on the Billboard 200. To promote the album, the band appeared live on The Midnight Special television show, performing "Paper Money" and "I Got the Fire".

After building acrimony between Ronnie Montrose and Sammy Hagar reached a peak during the band's 1974–75 European tour to promote Paper Money, Hagar parted ways with the band in early February 1975 and was replaced by vocalist Bob James.

Although the liner notes for the CD edition of Paper Money state that Ronnie Montrose was offered the lead guitar slot for Mott the Hoople when he left the Edgar Winter Group, the guitarist has stated that this never happened.

Track listing
Credits adapted from the album liner notes.

Paper Money (2017 rerelease bonus)
On October 13, 2017, Rhino Entertainment released a Deluxe Edition. The bonus disc tracks are from a session on KSAN radio from the Record Plant in Sausalito, California on December 26, 1974.

Personnel
Montrose
 Sammy Hagar – lead vocals on all songs except on "We're Going Home"
 Ronnie Montrose – guitar, lead vocals on "We're Going Home", producer
 Alan Fitzgerald – bass, synthesizer
 Denny Carmassi – drums, backing vocals

Additional musicians
 Mark Jordan – piano on "Connection"
 Nick DeCaro – mellotron on "We're Going Home"
 Charles Faris – special effects

Production
 Ted Templeman – producer
 Donn Landee – engineer

References

Other sources
 Montrose; Paper Money liner notes; Warner Brothers Records 1974

1974 albums
Montrose (band) albums
Albums produced by Ted Templeman
Warner Records albums